Dialogues Concerning Natural Religion is a philosophical work by the Scottish philosopher David Hume, first published in 1779. Through dialogue, three philosophers named Demea, Philo, and Cleanthes debate the nature of God's existence. Whether or not these names reference specific philosophers, ancient or otherwise, remains a topic of scholarly dispute. While all three agree that a god exists, they differ sharply in opinion on God's nature or attributes and how, or if, humankind can come to knowledge of a deity.

In the Dialogues, Hume's characters debate a number of arguments for the existence of God, and arguments whose proponents believe through which we may come to know the nature of God. Such topics debated include the argument from design—for which Hume uses a house—and whether there is more suffering or good in the world (argument from evil).

Hume started writing the Dialogues in 1750 but did not complete them until 1776, shortly before his death. They are based partly on Cicero's De Natura Deorum. The Dialogues were published posthumously in 1779, originally with neither the author's nor the publisher's name.

In The Blind Watchmaker (1986), evolutionary biologist Richard Dawkins discussed his choice to title his book after theologian William Paley's famous statement of the teleological argument, the watchmaker analogy, and noted that Hume's critique of the argument from design as an explanation of design in nature was the initial criticism that would ultimately be answered by Charles Darwin in On the Origin of Species (1859). In the second part of the Dialogues (1779), the character Philo observes that animal reproduction appears to be more responsible for the intricacies and order of animal bodies rather than intelligent design, stating:

Characters
Pamphilus is a youth present during the dialogues. In a letter, he reconstructs the conversation of Demea, Philo, and Cleanthes in detail for his friend Hermippus. He serves as the narrator throughout the piece. At the end of the Dialogues he believes that Cleanthes offered the strongest arguments. However, this could be out of loyalty to his teacher, as this does not seem to reflect Hume's own views on the topic. When other pieces on religion by Hume are taken into consideration, it may be noted that they all end with (apparently) ironic statements reaffirming the truth of Christian religious views. While the irony may be less readily evident in the Dialogues, this would suggest a similar reading of this work's ending. Cicero used a similar technique in his Dialogues. 
Cleanthes is an "experimental theist"—"an exponent of orthodox empiricism"—who bases his beliefs about God's existence and nature upon a version of the teleological argument, which uses evidence of design in the universe to argue for God's existence and resemblance to the human mind.
 Philo, according to the predominant view among scholars, is the character who presents views most similar to those of Hume. Philo, along with Demea, attacks Cleanthes' views on anthropomorphism and teleology; while not going as far as to deny the existence of God, Philo asserts that human reason is wholly inadequate to make any assumptions about the divine, whether through a priori reasoning or observation of nature.
 Demea "defends the Cosmological argument and philosophical theism..." He believes that the existence of God should be proven through a priori reasoning and that our beliefs about the nature of God should be based upon revelation and fideism. Demea rejects Cleanthes' "natural religion" for being too anthropomorphic.  Demea objects to the abandonment of the a priori arguments by Philo and Cleanthes (both of whom are empiricists) and perceives Philo to be "accepting an extreme form of skepticism."

References

External links 

 
 

1779 books
Books by David Hume
Books critical of religion
Arguments for the existence of God
Arguments against the existence of God
Criticism of intelligent design
Philosophy of religion literature
Concerning Natural Religion